Iuka is a city in Pratt County, Kansas, United States.  As of the 2020 census, the population of the city was 151.

History
Iuka was settled in 1877. It was named in commemoration of the Battle of Iuka in Iuka, Mississippi. Iuka was once the county seat.

The first post office in Iuka was established in December 1877.

Geography
Iuka is located at  (37.729696, -98.734758).

Demographics

2010 census
As of the census of 2010, there were 163 people, 79 households, and 49 families residing in the city. The racial makeup of the city was 96.9% White, 1.8% from other races, and 1.2% from two or more races. Hispanic or Latino of any race were 6.7% of the population.

There were 79 households, of which 24.1% had children under the age of 18 living with them, 55.7% were married couples living together, 5.1% had a female householder with no husband present, 1.3% had a male householder with no wife present, and 38.0% were non-families. 30.4% of all households were made up of individuals, and 12.7% had someone living alone who was 65 years of age or older. The average household size was 2.06 and the average family size was 2.59.

The median age in the city was 48.9 years. 19% of residents were under the age of 18; 5.6% were between the ages of 18 and 24; 21.5% were from 25 to 44; 29.4% were from 45 to 64; and 24.5% were 65 years of age or older. The gender makeup of the city was 49.7% male and 50.3% female.

2000 census
As of the census of 2000, there were 185 people, 78 households, and 60 families residing in the city. The racial makeup of the city was 98.38% White, 0.54% Native American, and 1.08% from two or more races.

There were 78 households, out of which 29.5% had children under the age of 18 living with them, 73.1% were married couples living together, 5.1% had a female householder with no husband present, and 21.8% were non-families. 20.5% of all households were made up of individuals, and 9.0% had someone living alone who was 65 years of age or older. The average household size was 2.37 and the average family size was 2.74.

In the city, the population was spread out, with 22.2% under the age of 18, 7.0% from 18 to 24, 28.1% from 25 to 44, 25.9% from 45 to 64, and 16.8% who were 65 years of age or older. The median age was 41 years. For every 100 females, there were 92.7 males. For every 100 females age 18 and over, there were 97.3 males.

The median income for a household in the city was $41,250, and the median income for a family was $43,125. Males had a median income of $38,125 versus $19,722 for females. The per capita income for the city was $21,462. None of the population or families were below the poverty line.

Education
The community is served by Pratt USD 382 public school district.

References

Further reading

External links
 City of Iuka
 Iuka - Directory of Public Officials
 Iuka city map, KDOT

Cities in Kansas
Cities in Pratt County, Kansas
1877 establishments in Kansas
Populated places established in 1877